The 18th Asian Athletics Championships were held in Guangzhou, China in 2009.

Results

Men's results

Track

Field

Women's results

Track

Field

Medal table

Participating nations

 (12)
 (1)
 (1)
 (77)
 (22)
 (16)
 (53)
 (6)
 (15)
 (5)
 (55)
 (5)
 (23)
 (9)
 (3)
 (1)
 (2)
 (4)
 (17)
 (1)
 (6)
 (4)
 (3)
 (5)
 (5)
 (9)
 (17)
 (10)
 (26)
 (21)
 (4)
 (5)
 (25)
 (2)
 (6)
 (19)
 (10)

References
Liu Xiang the main attraction on home soil at the Asian Championships - PREVIEW . IAAF (2009-11-09). Retrieved on 2011-07-09.
Two golds for host Chinese as Asian Champs kick off in Guangzhou. IAAF (2009-11-11). Retrieved on 2011-07-09.
Six more gold for China in Guangzhou - Asian champs, day 2 . IAAF (2009-11-12). Retrieved on 2011-07-09.
Taking centre stage, Liu Xiang beats the rain to take Asian title – Asian champs, day 3. IAAF (2009-11-13). Retrieved on 2011-07-09.
With five wins, Japan halts Chinese momentum in Guangzhou - Asian champs, day 4. IAAF (2009-11-09). Retrieved on 2011-07-09.
Another strong day for Japan as Asian championships conclude . IAAF (2009-11-09). Retrieved on 2011-07-09.
Full results – Day 1
Full results – Day 2
Full results – Day 3
Full results – Day 4
Full results – Day 5

External links 
 Asian Athletics Association
 GBR Athletics
 Official website

 
Asian Athletics Championships
Asian Championships
A
International athletics competitions hosted by China
2009 in Chinese sport
2009 in Asian sport
November 2009 sports events in China